Daniel Corkery (20 September 1883 – 23 April 1961) was an Irish politician and Commandant in the Irish Republican Army (IRA) during the Irish War of Independence. From Macroom, County Cork, Corkery was one of the main IRA officers during the Coolavokig ambush in February 1921.

At the 1921 general election he was elected unopposed to the Second Dáil as a Sinn Féin Teachta Dála (TD) for the Cork Mid, North, South, South East and West constituency. An anti-Treaty member from January 1922, he did not take his seat in the Third Dáil.  He was elected to the 4th Dail at the 1923 general election for the new Cork North constituency, again as an anti-treaty republican. After his re-election at the June 1927 general election as Independent republican, he joined the newly created Fianna Fáil party and took his seat with other Fianna Fáil deputies in August 1927.

Corkery was re-elected as a Fianna Fáil TD at the September 1927 general election, but lost his seat at the 1932 general election.  He re-gained his seat at the 1933 general election, but again lost his seat at the 1937 general election. In 1938 he was elected to the revived Seanad Éireann and continued as a Senator until 1948.

References

1883 births
1961 deaths
Fianna Fáil TDs
Members of the 2nd Dáil
Members of the 3rd Dáil
Members of the 4th Dáil
Members of the 5th Dáil
Members of the 6th Dáil
Members of the 8th Dáil
Members of the 2nd Seanad
Members of the 3rd Seanad
Members of the 4th Seanad
Members of the 5th Seanad
Irish Republican Army (1919–1922) members
People of the Irish Civil War (Anti-Treaty side)
Politicians from County Cork
Early Sinn Féin TDs
Independent TDs
Fianna Fáil senators
People from Macroom